Minuscule 262 (in the Gregory-Aland numbering), ε 1020 (Soden), is a Greek minuscule manuscript of the New Testament, on parchment. Palaeographically it has been assigned to the 10th century. It has marginalia.

Description 

The codex contains the text of the four Gospels on 212 parchment leaves. The text is written in two columns per page, in 27 lines.

The Ammonian Sections and references to the Eusebian Canons to Gospel of Luke and Gospel of John were added by a later hand.

It has the famous Jerusalem Colophon ("from the ancient manuscripts of Jerusalem").

Text 

The Greek text of the codex is a representative of the Byzantine text-type. Hermann von Soden classified it to the textual group Ir. Aland placed it in Category V.

According to the Claremont Profile Method it represents textual group Λ.

It has some rare readings like codex Λ, 300, 376, and 428.

History 

According to Gregory it could have been written in Italy. In 1735 it was brought from Constantinople to Europe.

The manuscripts was added to the list of New Testament manuscripts by Scholz (1794-1852). It was examined and described by Paulin Martin. C. R. Gregory saw the manuscript in 1884.

The manuscript is currently housed at the Bibliothèque nationale de France (Gr. 53) at Paris.

See also 

 List of New Testament minuscules
 Biblical manuscript
 Textual criticism

References

Further reading 

 J. M. A. Scholz, Curae, p. 42 f,
 J. M. A. Scholz, Biblisch-kritische Reise in Frankreich, der Schweiz, Italien, Palästine und im Archipel in den Jahren 1818, 1819, 1820, 1821: Nebst einer Geschichte des Textes des Neuen Testaments, Leipzig, 1823, p. 11-16.

External links 

 R. Waltz, Minuscule 262, Encyclopedia of Textual Criticism

Greek New Testament minuscules
10th-century biblical manuscripts
Bibliothèque nationale de France collections